Armando Celada (1901 – death date unknown) was a Cuban shortstop in the Negro leagues in the 1920s.

A native of Cienfuegos, Cuba, Celada played for the Cuban Stars (West) in 1929. In 36 recorded games, he posted 24 hits in 128 plate appearances.

References

External links
 and Seamheads

1901 births
Date of birth missing
Place of birth missing
Year of death missing
Place of death missing
Cuban Stars (West) players
Baseball shortstops
People from Cienfuegos
Cuban expatriate baseball players in the United States